Claudia de' Medici (4 June 1604 – 25 December 1648) was Regent of the Austrian County of Tyrol during the minority of her son from 1632 until 1646. 
She was a daughter of Ferdinando I de' Medici, Grand Duke of Tuscany and Christina of Lorraine. She was born in Florence, and was named after her grandmother Claude of Valois, herself granddaughter of Claude, Duchess of Brittany, consort to King Francis I of France.

Biography

Duchess of Urbino 
In 1620, she married Federico Ubaldo della Rovere, the only son of Francesco Maria II della Rovere, Duke of Urbino. Their only child, Vittoria, went on to marry the Grand Duke of Tuscany. Federico Ubaldo della Rovere died suddenly on 29 June 1623.

Archduchess of Tyrol 

After her husband's premature death, she was married, on 19 April 1626, to Leopold V, Archduke of Austria, and thus became Archduchess consort of Austria.

Regent of Tyrol
On the death of her husband in 1632, she assumed a regency in the name of her son Ferdinand Charles who was the ruler of the Princely County of Tyrol. Claudia, along with five directors, held the post until 1646. She died at Innsbruck in 1648.

Issue 

She had one child by Federico Ubaldo della Rovere:

 Vittoria della Rovere (1622–1694) married Ferdinando II de' Medici, Grand Duke of Tuscany,

She had five children by Leopold V:

 Maria Eleonora of Austria (1627–1629) died in infancy.
 Ferdinand Charles of Austria (1628–1662) married Anna de' Medici
 Isabella Clara of Austria (1629–1685), who married Charles III, Duke of Mantua and had issue.
 Sigismund Francis of Austria (1630–1665), Count of Tyrol and Regent of Further Austria, who married Countess Palatine Maria Hedwig Auguste of Sulzbach (1650–1681) and had no issue.
 Maria Leopoldine of Austria (1632–1649), who married Holy Roman Emperor Ferdinand III (1608–1657)

Ancestors

References

Sources

External links 

1604 births
1648 deaths
Duchesses of Urbino
Austrian royal consorts
Claudia de' Medici
Claudia de' Medici
Nobility from Florence
17th-century Italian nobility
Della Rovere family
17th-century women rulers
17th-century Italian women
Tuscan princesses
Daughters of monarchs
Remarried royal consorts